Nodaway can refer to some places in the United States:

 Nodaway County, Missouri
 Nodaway, Iowa
 The Nodaway River, in Iowa and Missouri

See also

Nodaway Township (disambiguation)